The XXX World Rhythmic Gymnastics Championships were held in Moscow, Russia from 20 to 26 September 2010 at the Olympiysky Sports Complex. The events were all-around, ball, ribbon, hoop, rope and the group all around, group 5 hoops and group 3 ribbons + 2 ropes.

Medal winners

* reserve gymnast

Individual

Qualification
  Ana Milagros Carrasco Pini
  Ayelen Paez Pieri
  Dar'Ya Shara
  Naira Minasyan
  Asya Simonyan
  Inesa Simonyan
  Ayiesha Johnston
  Janine Murray
  Danielle Prince
  Enid Sung
  Selina Poestinger
  Nicol Ruprecht
  Caroline Weber
  Aliya Garayeva
  Anna Gurbanova
  Samira Mustafayeva
  Liubou Charkashyna
  Aliaksandra Narkevich
  Hanna Rabtsava
  Melitina Staniouta
  Angelica Kvieczynski
  Drielly Neves Daltoe
  Rafaela Pedral Costa
  Eliane Rosa Sampaio
  Mariya Mateva
  Monika Mincheva
  Silviya Miteva
  Tsvetelina Stoyanova
  Mariam Chamilova
  Demetra Mantcheva
  Nerissa Mo
  Cristina Francisca Bello Contreras
  Senyue Deng
  Baobao Dou
  Yanan Hou
  Linyi Peng
  Chrystalleni Trikomiti
  Nataly Hamrikova
  Monika Mickova
  Zuzana Valkova
  Heba Khaled Elbourini
  Yasmin Mohamed Rostom
  Mariz Farid Shawki
  Marina Fernandez
  Natalia García
  Carolina Rodriguez
  Julia Uson Carvajal
  Olga Bogdanova
  Viktoria Bogdanova
  Julija Makusina
  Silja Ahonen
  Inessa Rif
  Julia Romanjuk
  Delphine Ledoux
  Rachel Ennis
  Lynne Hutchison
  Francesca Jones
  Filipa Simeonova
  Varvara Filiou
  Artemi Gavezou Castro
  Michaela Metallidou
  Fanni Dalma Forray
  Anna Violetta Szaloki
  Dora Vass
  Kshipra Joshi
  Akshata Shete
  Pooja Surve
  Dana Adiv
  Irina Risenson
  Neta Rivkin
  Martina Alicata Terranova
  Julieta Cantaluppi
  Federica Febbo
  Yuria Onuki
  Runa Yamaguchi
  Anna Alyabyeva
  Mizana Ismailova
  Madina Mukanova
  Marina Petrakova
  Ainura Sharshembieva
  Gim Yun-hee
  Lee Kyung-hwa
  Shin Soo-ji
  Son Yeon-jae
  Jelizaveta Gamalejeva
  Veronika Romanova
  Jana Rudova
  Anastasija Suhova
  Nur Hidayah Abdul Wahid
  Elaine Koon
  Veronica Cumatrenco
  Ana Toma
  Rut Castillo Galindo
  Veronica Alejandra Navarro Blizzard
  Cynthia Valdez Perez
  Alejandra Vazquez Lopez
  Nicole Monique Bierbach
  Thea Elise Holte
  Josefine Hustoft
  Frida Parnas
  Yngvild Romcke
  Joanna Mitrosz
  Angelika Paradowska
  Marta Szamalek
  Aya Hosain
  Samia Hussain
  Alexandra Piscupescu
  Adriana Cecilia Teocan
  Grace Legote
  Sibongile Mjekula
  Julene Van Rooyen
  Daria Dmitrieva
  Evgenia Kanaeva
  Daria Kondakova
  Yana Lukonina
  Pia Arhar
  Grusa Kocica
  Evita Psenicny
  Tjasa Seme
  Tijana Krsmanovic
  Andrea Moskovljevic
  Ivana Dermekova
  Jana Duchnovska
  Alexandra Pokorna
  Renata Smilnicka
  Therese Larsson
  Mikaela Lindholm
  Jennifer Pettersson
  Sirirat Lueprasert
  Manee Patanapongpibul
  Tharatip Sridee
  Nevin Sevinc Deveci
  Burcin Neziroglu
  Gozde Ozkebapci
  Nataliia Godunko
  Alina Maksymenko
  Ganna Rizatdinova
  Joanna Arnold
  Shelby Kisiel
  Olga Pavlenko
  Julie Zetlin
  Evelina Kalisher
  Djamila Rakhmatova
  Zamirajon Sanokulova
  Ulyana Trofimova
  Andreina Acevedo Martinez
  Katherin Arias Olive
  Leiyineth Medrano Rodriguez

Rope
The final was held on Tuesday, 21 September at 18:30 local time.

Hoop
The final was held on Tuesday, 21 September at 19:00 local time.

Ball
The final was held on Thursday, 23 September at 18:30 local time.

Ribbon
The final was held on Thursday, 23 September at 19:00 local time.

Teams
The competition was held from 20 to 23 September.

All-around
The competition was held at 24 September at 19:00 local time.

Groups

Group compositions
  Jaelle Cohen
  Anna Lorigan
  Claudia Pillay
  Samantha Richardson
  Enid Sung
  Kate Western
  Barbara Sophie Lanzer
  Sophia Lindtner
  Claudia Linert
  Susanna Proell
  Melissa Schmidt
  Natascha Wegscheider
  Nigar Abdusalimova
  Jeyla Guliyeva
  Ayelita Khalafova
  Anastasiya Prasolova
  Stefani Trayanova
  Yevgeniya Zhidkova
  Maryna Hancharova
  Anastasiya Ivankova
  Aliaksandra Osipava
  Kseniya Sankovich
  Alina Tumilovich
  Ana Paula De Alencar
  Leticia Dutra
  Larissa Maia Barata
  Jessica Maier
  Luisa Harumi Matsuo
  Ana Paula Ribeiro
  Reneta Kamberova
  Mihaela Maevska
  Tsvetelina Naydenova
  Elena Todorova
  Hristiana Todorova
  Katrin Velkova
  Rose Cossar
  Karah Klodt
  Alexandra Landry
  Alexandra Lukashova
  Kelsey Titmarsh
  Ani Wells
  Yuyan Bao
  Xiaoyi Long
  Lijia Wang
  Xue Wang
  Yuting Wang
  Li Zou
  Loreto Achaerandio
  Sandra Aguilar
  Miriam Belando Consuegra
  Elena Lopez
  Alejandra Quereda
  Lidia Redondo
  Jenna Alavahtola
  Julia Kinnunen
  Aino Poytaniemi
  Rebecca Sutton
  Salla Helena Johanna Vikkula
  Noemie Balthazard
  Adelaide Deloeuvre
  Melanie Haag
  Jeanne Isenmann
  Lea Peinoit
  Violaine Robinet
  Samantha Dean
  Kerrie Denton
  Hannah Dulston
  Louisa Pouli
  Rachel Smith
  Ketevani Asitashvili
  Romina Bozhilova
  Martina Grozeva
  Teona Khelaia
  Irine Khoperia
  Mira Bimperling
  Camilla Pfeffer
  Cathrin Puhl
  Sara Radman
  Regina Sergeeva
  Alexandra Georgovasili
  Stavroula Samara
  Athina Tsinaslanidou
  Despoina Tsoumalakou
  Marianthi Zafeiriou
  Julianna Buda
  Judith Hauser
  Barbara Katona
  Fanni Kohlhoffer
  Daria Topic
  Agnes Vandor
  Moran Buzovski
  Viktoriya Koshel
  Noa Palatchy
  Marina Shults
  Polina Zakaluzny
  Eliora Zholkovsky
  Elisa Blanchi
  Giulia Galtarossa
  Romina Laurito
  Daniela Masseroni
  Elisa Santoni
  Anzhelika Savrayuk
  Yuka Endo
  Natsuki Fukase
  Airi Hatakeyama
  Rie Matsubara
  Nina Saeedyokota
  Kotono Tanaka
  Valeriya Danilina
  Viktoriya Fedonyuk
  Akbota Kalimzhanova
  Dinara Serikbayeva
  Darya Shevchenko
  Aliya Tleubayeva
  Ji Seon Baek
  Hyeonhee Choi
  Hyejeang Ha
  Hyejin Kim
  Kyung Eun Lee
  Unjin Sin
  Zuzanna Klajman
  Monika Raszke
  Patrycja Romik
  Aleksandra Wojcik
  Katarzyna Zuchlinska
  Ryon Choe
  Un Byol Kang
  Song Sun Kim
  Song Mi Mun
  Jin Ju Ri
  Uliana Donskova
  Ekaterina Malygina
  Anastasia Nazarenko
  Natalia Pichuzhkina
  Tatiana Sergeeva
  Daria Shcherbakova
  Capucine Jelmi
  Nathanya Koehn
  Marine Perichon
  Carol Rohatsch
  Lisa Tacchelli
  Souheila Yacoub
  Olena Dmytrash
  Viktoriya Lenyshyn
  Svitlana Prokopova
  Valeria Shurkhal
  Iuliia Slobodyan
  Olga Zaytseva
  Jessica Bogdanov
  Stephanie Flaksman
  Megan Frohlich
  Michelle Przybylo
  Sofya Roytburg
  Sydney Sachs
  Lyubov Dropets
  Veronika Esipova
  Ekaterina Safronova
  Inara Sattarova
  Yayra Serjanova
  Catherine Carolina Cortez Egea
  Marian Carlina Parra Rodriguez
  Michelle Sanchez Salazar
  Nathalia Jesus Serrano Sanchez
  Nathalia De Jesus Silva Amaro
  Alejandra Carolina Vasquez Castillo

All-around
The final was held at 25 September 2010 at 14:00 local time.

5 Hoops
The final was held on Sunday, 26 September at 14:00 local time.

3 Ribbons + 2 Ropes
The final was held on Sunday, 26 September at 14:00 local time.

Medal table

References

External links
 Official Site

Rhythmic Gymnastics World Championships
World Rhythmic Gymnastics Championships
R
International gymnastics competitions hosted by Russia